Cecilie Pedersen (born 14 September 1990) is a Norwegian footballer that plays as a striker.

Club career
Pedersen hails from Førde in Sveio. She played for SK Haugar until she moved to Avaldsnes IL ahead of the 2009 season  on a three-year contract that reportedly made her one of the highest paid women footballers in the country. On 6 November 2009, she won the Gullballen, the most prestigious Norwegian football prize.

In 2010, she continued to play for Avaldsnes in the 2nd division while also playing in the national team, but later in the season she was in dispute with the club.  National team trainer Eli Landsem advised her strongly to transfer to a Toppserien club, and she entered discussions with Arna-Bjørnar in Bergen at the end of 2010.  Avaldsnes made financial demands in compensation for her high salary and the hire of her club car, and local businessmen stepped in with offers.  However, on 19 February 2011 it was reported that the parties had failed to reach agreement because her pay requirements were excessive relative to the pay of the other players.

In January 2012 Pedersen signed with LSK Kvinner FK.

Career statistics

International career
In June 2009 she was called up to the national team for the European Championships, and in the second game, against Iceland, she was the matchwinner with her goal before the break. She scored Norway's third goal in the quarter final against Sweden which Norway won 3–1.

References

1990 births
Living people
Norwegian women's footballers
Norway women's international footballers
People from Hordaland
People from Sveio
Toppserien players
Avaldsnes IL players
LSK Kvinner FK players
2011 FIFA Women's World Cup players
Women's association football forwards
Sportspeople from Vestland